Jessore District (Bengali: যশোর, pronounced Jaw-shore, Anglicised: Jessore), officially spelled Jashore District from April 2018, is a district in the southwestern region of Bangladesh. It is bordered by India to the west, Khulna District and Satkhira District to the south, Khulna and Narail to the east, and Jhenaidah District and Magura District to the north. Jessore is the capital of the district.

Jessore district was established in 1781. It consists of 8 municipalities, 8 upazilas, 92 unions, 1329 mouzas, 1477 villages and 120 mahallas. The upazilas are: Abhaynagar Upazila, Bagherpara Upazila, Chaugachha Upazila, Jessore Sadar Upazila, Jhikargachha Upazila, Keshabpur Upazila, Manirampur Upazila, and Sharsha Upazila.

The district produces a variety of crops year-round. Date sugar, called patali, is made from the sap of locally grown date trees. It is cooked, thickened and crystallised using a traditional method. Patali is mainly produced in Khajura, but many date trees are cultivated in the Keshabpur Upazila and Manirampur Upazila areas.

History
Jessore district once belonged to the ancient Janapada of Vanga (বঙ্গ) Janapada. In the 15th century, Jessore was a part of the kingdom of Pratapaditya. It was then conquered by the Mughals.

British administration was finally established in Jessore district in 1781 when the governor-general ordered the opening of a court at Murali near Jessore. In 1947, Jessore was divided between India and (then) Pakistan. Except for the Bangaon and Gaighata thanas, the district became part of East Pakistan.

The Bengali soldiers stationed at Jessore cantonment mutinied against the Pakistan Army on 29 March 1971. They were led by Captain Hafiz Uddin and Lieutenant Anwar in an uprising where 300 soldiers were killed. The rebels killed 50 Pakistani soldiers with machine gun fire at Chanchara.

On 6 December 1971, Jessore became the first district of Bengal to be liberated from Pakistani forces. And Jessore is the first digital district in Bangladesh.

Geography
Jessore District encompasses 2606.98 km2. It is bounded by Jhenaidaha and Magura districts at the north, Satkhira and Khulna districts at the south, Narail and Khulna districts at the east, and North 24 Parganas and Nadia districts of West Bengal of India at the west. Major rivers that flow through this region are the Bhairab, Teka, Hari, Sree, Aparbhadra, Harihar, Buribhadra, Chitra, Betna, Kopotakkho, and the Mukteshwari.

Climate

Demographics

According to the 2011 Bangladesh census, Jessore District had a population of 2,764,547, of which 1,386,293 were males and 1,378,254 females. Rural population was 2,250,995 (81.42%) and urban population was 513,552 (18.58%). Jessore had a literacy rate of 56.52% for the population 7 years and above: 59.38% for males and 53.65% for females.

The main occupations are agriculture 39.84%, agricultural labourer 24.13%, wage labourer 2.68%, commerce 11.99%, service 8.66%, industry 1.41%, transport 3.11% and others 8.18%.

Jessore District's administrative framework was established in 1781. It consists of the following eight Upazilas

The upazilas are further divided into 9 municipalities, 36 wards, 92 unions, 1329 mouzas, 1434 villages and 120 mahallas.

Economy

Benapol Land Port
The main factor of the economics of Jessore is Benapol Land Port which is situated in Sharsha Upazila. Much of the import and export trading between Bangladesh and India is done through this port. On the other side of the border is Petrapole. The port is important for making govt. import taxes.

Arts and culture

Points of interest

 Sagardari is the birthplace of the poet Michael Madhusudan Dutta. His large villa consists of a huge garden, a small museum and houses. The front gate has a solid sculpture work. The Kobodak River is at a stone's throw away.
 Bharat Bhaina (locally called Bharter Dewl) is the relics of ancient Buddhist Temple of the 6th century  at Keshabpur
 Mirzanagar Hammamkhana is a structure of Mughal's at Keshabpur
 Dhalijhara Buddha Bihar is one of the outstretched and unique Buddhist Temple of the 8th century among the South -Asia  at Keshabpur
 Birthplace and residence of Dhiraj Bhattacharya who was a film actor of undivided India and litterateur mostly known for his two autobiographies:Jakhan Police Chhilam  and Jakhan Nayak Chhilam. He is also popular for Mathin's Well at Teknaf where a tribal girl, Mathin suicide herself for him after his return to Kolkata at Keshabpur
Sheikhpura 3 Domed Mosque where poet Michael Madhusudan Dutta learned  Persian language at Keshabpur
Khan Jahan Ali's Dighi at Keshabpur
Marshina Baor, a proposed ecopark at Keshabpur
 The Capital City of flower in Bangladesh, Godkhali Jhikargachha Upazila...
 Katakhal Bangabandhu Park Jhikargachha Upazila...
 At Abhaynagar Upazila, there is a small village called Dhoolgraam. It once had a magnificent complex of 17 Hindu temples, but only one remains today. Most of the temples were destroyed by the Bhairab River. A beautiful terracotta design can be seen all over the temple. It is considered a very holy place by Bengali Hindus.

 In Vaatnogor at Abhaynagar Upazila, ruins of eleven temple complex, dedicated to Shiva, remains. Though the central temple is partially destroyed, the site still shows the majesty of Bengal's glorious past.
 A terracotta plaque bearing the image of Mallinath, a female tirthankar (saint) of the Jain religion, was found at the Mound of Dam Dam Peer in Manirampur Upazila.  It is believed to be the most ancient relic discovered from this part of the world. The Department at Khulna said that the plaque is at least 1800 years old. It is currently kept at the Khulna Museum.
 Besides, "Neelkuthi" at village Joypur & "Kachari Ghar" are important archaeological sites in Manirampur

 Imam Bara, at Murolir Mor beside the Dhaka-Khulna Highway, is a historical building constructed by Hazi Muhammad Mohsin.
 The Jessore Collectorate Building, in Doratana, is one of the oldest buildings in Jessore.
 Near Jessore Sadar Upazila village Hamidpur has an ancient mosque, known as "Shani mosque." It is an example of the high architecture of Muslim Sultani period.
 Godkhali kalibari
 Panchpukur Baganchara
 Binodia Park
 Upashahar Park
 Jessore Boat-club
 Jess-garden Park
 Rajgonj Baor
 Vobodaho Bil
 Gazir Dorgah
 Jessore Airport, Jessore Cantonment and Air Force Base Matiur Rahman.
 Avaynogor's Khanjahan Ali Jame Mosque
 Jamidar Bari at Shridhorpur
 Konnadah Archajjo Baor at Sarsha
 Benapole port
 Fakhir Tika at Godkhali
 Shimulia Mission (Saheb Bari)
 Grave of Birshrestho Lance Nayek Noor Muhammad Sheikh
 Khatura Baor
 Moktarpur Lalu Babu Jamidar Bari
Solo Khada Jamidar Bari, House and birthplace of Ratna Gorva awarded by British Govt. and her son former Health minister of India Dr. Nil Ratan Dhor and his brother Jebon Ratan Dhor

Transport 
Jessore has well connected road, rail and air transport links to other major cities and water transport links to Khulna and Mongla of Bangladesh. It boasts one of the first rail networks established in the Indian subcontinent.

Road 
Jessore is located 270 km south west from   Dhaka capital of Bangladesh by road and 60 km north from Khulna . It is also connected with the Indian city of Kolkata which is 120 km west through Benapole land port via AH1. The road from Jessore to Kolkata  is a part of the historic Jessore Road.

Railway 
Jessore Junction railway station is a major junction on the broad gauge-based network of the Western Railway. The network has links extended into Indian territory. Service linking the capital Dhaka and Kolkata April 2008. As well as in 2019 Both India And Bangladesh government agreed to 4 minute stop in Jessore Junction railway station through Bandhan Express which connect Khulna to Kolkata.

Air 

The Jessore Airport, near the city, is an airfield for the Bangladesh Air Force. One of the oldest airfield in Bangladesh and the subcontinent. Alongside military service, its runway caters to seven commercial flights daily which includes US Bangla, Novo and Biman Bangladesh Airlines, for domestic flights.

Education

Universities
 Jashore University of Science and Technology

Medical colleges
 Jashore Medical College
 Army Medical College, Jashore

Polytechnic institutes 
 Jessore Polytechnic Institute
 Muslim Aid Institute of Technology
 BCMC College of Engineering & Technology
 Bangladesh Technical College
 Model Polytechnic Institute
 City Polytechnic Institute
 Kapotakkho Polytechnic College
 Manirampur Polytechnic Institute

Schools and colleges
 Michael Madhusudan College
 Upashahar Women Degree College, Jessore
 Dr. Abdur Razzak Municipal College, Jessore
 Upashahar College, Jessore
 Jessore Cantonment College, Jessore
 Jessore Shilkha Board Model School and College, Upashahar
 Talbaria Degree College, Sadar, Jessore
 Jessore Government Technical School and College
 Govt. M M College, Jessore
 Singia Adarsha College; Basundia, Jessore
 Noapara Model College
 BAF Shaheen college
 Dawood Public School, Jessore
 Sarsha Upazilla College, Sarsha, Jessore
 Sarsha pilot govt. secondary school, Sarsha, Jessore
 Jessore Technical School & College (JTSC), Jessore
 Manirampur Degree College
 Jessore College, Jessore
 Rajganj Degree College
 Bakra Degree college
 Navaran Degree college
 Natunhat Public College,
 Masiahati Degree College, Jessore
 Kazi Nazrul Islam Degree College, Jessore
 Jessore Govt. Mahila College
 No 29 Upashahar Government Primary School, Jessore
Jessore Government City College 
 Noapara College, Abhaynagar, Jessore
 Nehalpur School & College, Monirampur, Jessore
 Gopalpur School & College, Monirampu, Jessore
 Madonpur Shammilloni Degree College, Monirampur, Jessore
 Rajgong Degree College, Monirampur, Jessore
 Khadapara College, Monirampur, Jessore
 Polashi College, Monirampur, Jessore
 Bhir Sherestto Nur Mohammad college
 Shahid Moshiur Rahman Degree College, Jhekargacha, Jessore
 Jhekargacha Mohila College, Jhekargacha, Jessore
 Shammilloni College, Jhekargacha, Jessore
 Hamidpur Al-hera Degree College
 Pakshi College, Sharsha
 Lokhonpur College, Sharsha
 Sharatola College, Sharsha
 Nagar College, Jhekargacha
 Kashebpur College, Kashebpur
 Benapole degree College, Sharsha
 Bagachra Degree College, Sharsha
 Shimulia College, Jhekargacha
 Bakra Mohila College, Jhekargacha
 Abhaynagar Degree College
 Bagarpara Degree College
 Pashapol Model College
 Chowgacha govt. College, Chowgacha
 Mridhapara Mohila College, chowgacha
 Muktijoddha Degree College, Rudrapur, Jessore Sadar, Jessore,
 Ganganandapur Degree College, Jhikargacha, Jessore
 Jessore English School and College, Jessore
 (JS) Balia Vakutiya High School Jessore
 Muslim Academy Jessore School
 Nabo-Nagori Girls High School, Upashahar, Jessore
 Keshabpur Pilot School & College
 MSTP girls High School
 Ibn Sina Pre Cadet School, New Town, Jessore
 Trimohini High School
 Badshah Faisal Islami Institute Eidgah, Jessore
 Badsha Faisal Islami Institute, New Town Jessore
 Bankra J.K High School
 Talbaria High School, Sadar, Jessore
 Rajghat Jafarpur Jigh School
 GT Model Girls High School, Talbaria, Sadar, Jessore
 Talbaria Dhakhil Madrasa, Sadar, Jessore
 Noapara Model Secondary School
 Deapara Model Secondary School, Abhaynagar, Jessore
 Moktarpur Gualbari High School, Monirampur, Jessore
 Abdul Bari High School, Barinagar Bazar, Jessore
 Buruj Bagan High School, Navaron Bazar
 Buruj Bagan Pilot Girls School, Navaron Bazar
 Beanpole high school, sarsha, Jessore
 Jessore Zilla School
 Dawood Public School, Jessore
 Cantonment High School, Jessore
 Government Girls' High School, Jessore
 Hashimpur Secondary School, Jessore Sadar, Jessore
 Jessore Laboratory School and Collage, Jessore
 Jhikargachha B. M. High School
 Jhikargacha Government M.L Model High School
 Manirampur Government High School
 Manirampur Government Girls' High School
 Police Line Secondary School Jessore
 D.S.T High School, jamtola, sharsha
 Chandipur High School, Manirampur
 Rajganj High School
 Gatipara High School, Sharsha
 Narendrapur High School
 Galda Kharinchi Shammillioni High School, Manirampur
 Monin Nagar High School, Jessore Sadar
 Gopalpur School & College, Monirampur
 Nehalpur School & College, Monirampur
 Pulerhat ML High School
 Bahadurpur High School
 Rajghat Jaforpur High School, Abhaynagar
 Rajghat Jaforpur Girl's High School, Abhaynagar
 Chowgacha Shahadat Pilot Secondary High School
 Hazi Mohammad Mortoz Ali High School
 Sukpukuria Secondary School
 Sammilani Institution, Jessore
 Suratjan Secondary High School, Jhikargachha
 Sammilani High School, Dhuliani
 Jessore Shikkha Board govt Model School And Collage
 Digdana High School
 Baliadanga U.P High School
 Katgara Secondary School, Purapara Bazar, Chowgaccha, Jessore
 Andulia Secondary School
 Makapur-Bollovpur High School
 Kochua High School, Sador, Jessore
 Magura M.L High School, Magura hat, Abhaynagar, Jessore
 Komolpur Secondary School, Manirampur, Jessore
 Mahidia High School, Mahidia, Jessore Sadar, Jessore
 Kayemkola Secondary School, Jhikargacha, Jessore
 Alimonnessa Girl's School & College, Jhikargacha, Jessore

Media

Local newspapers and magazines
List of daily newspapers
 Daily Samajer Katha
 Daily Noapara
 Daily Kalyan
 Daily Purobi
 Daily Deshitaishy (দৈনিক দেশহিতৈষী)
 Daily Sfulingo (দৈনিক স্ফুলিঙ্গ )
 Daily Jessore
 Daily Loksamaj
 Daily Gramer kagoj
 Daily Pravat Feri
 Daily Samajer Kagoj
 Daily Spandan
 Daily Gramer Kantha
 Daily Telegram
 Daily Satya Path
 Daily Joruri Shangbad

List of weekly magazines
 Weekly Sonali Din
 Weekly Nawapara
 Weekly Banglalok
 Weekly Manabadhikar Sangbad
 Weekly Bojro kolom
 Weekly Sharsha Barta
 Weekly Prattohiki
 Weekly Ganomanos

List of Fortnightly
 Mot-Motantar

List of monthly magazines
 Monthly Ghumonter Dak
 Monthly Gramer Sangbad
 Monthly Photo Report

List of literary magazines
 Bangla Literature
 চেতনা।

Notable people 

Maharaja Pratapaditya – Medieval Bengali warrior, adhipati or ruler of Kingdom of Jessore. 
Michael Madhusudan Datta – Bengali poet and playwright.
Manomohan Bose – Bengali poet, playwright and journalist 
Jnanadanandini Devi – Bengali writer, social reformer, pioneer in women’s movement in India
Prafulla Chandra Ray – Bengali chemist, philanthropist and otherwise known as father of modern chemical science in India
Kali Nath Roy – Nationalist journalist and the chief editor of the newspaper The Tribune
Saroj Dutta – Indian political activist, poet, editor of Amrit Bazar Patrika 
 N. G. Majumdar – An Indian archaeologist who is credited with having discovered 62 Indus Valley Civilization sites in Sindh including Chanhudaro
 P. C. Bose – Freedom fighter, labor activist and politician
 Kanak Mukherjee – Political activist, women’s movement pioneer in India
 Farida Akhtar Babita – Film actress
 Dinesh Chandra Chattopadhyay – Writer and editor
 Haridasa Thakur – Vaishnab saint, acarya of the Holy Name
 Jatin Bala – Poet and Dalit author
 Ahmed Ali Enayetpuri – Islamic scholar and member of the Bengal Legislative Assembly
 Mashiur Rahman – Politician of the Awami League
 Munshi Mohammad Meherullah – Muslim poet, religious leader and social reformer
 Syed Rasel – Bangladeshi cricketer, Bangladesh cricket team
 Iqbal Quadir – Founder of Grameenphone
 M. Shamsher Ali – Bangladeshi astrophysicist
 Jiban Ratan Dhar – Politician, army officer
 ASHK Sadek – Former Education Minister of Bangladesh
 Mohammad Moniruzzaman – Writer, poet, professor, freedom fighter and lyricist[1]
 Mohammad Rafiquzzaman – Lyricist
 Paran Bandopadhyay – Indian  film and television actor
 Mustafa Monwar – Painter, sculptor, artist
 S. M. Imdadul Hoque – Bangladesh Army officer who fought and died in the Bangladesh Liberation war. He was posthumously awarded Bir Uttom, the second-highest military honor in Bangladesh
 Kazi Kamrul Hassan – Bangladesh Navy commodore and MD of Khulna Shipyard
 Champa – Actress, model
 Kishori Mohan Bandyopadhyay – Bengali scientist, social worker and freedom fighter
 Sanatana Goswami – Sage and a prominent writer from Middle Ages 
 Rupa Goswami – Bengali poet, philosopher and writer in Vaishnab tradition from Middle Ages 
 Latifur Rahman – 10th Chief Justice of Bangladesh and the 2nd Chief Adviser of Bangladesh
 Shuchanda – Bangladeshi film actress and director

See also

 Khulna Division

References

External links
 

 
Districts of Bangladesh
Districts of Bangladesh established before 1971
Khulna Division